Ernst Suffert (fl. 1900) was a German entomologist who specialised in studies of Lepidoptera.

Ernst Suffert described  many new species of African butterflies and moths, including Papilio chrapkowskii, Papilio filaprae, Mylothris ertli and Mylothris schumanni. His collection was purchased by James John Joicey.

Works
Suffert, Ernst; & Zocher, H. (1924): Morphologie und Optik der Schmetterlingsschuppen insbesondere die Schillerfarben de Schmetterlinge. Z. Morphol. Öekol. Tiere 1, pp. 171–308
Suffert, E., 1900  Eine neue Aberration des Danaus dorippus Klug aus Deutsch-Ostafrika. Berliner Entomologische Zeitschrift 45:115-116.
Suffert, E., 1904  Neue afrikanisches Tagfalter aus dem Kon. Zool. Museum, Berlin, und meiner Sammlung. Deutsche Entomologische Zeitschrift, Iris 17:12-107.
 Suffert, E., 1904  Neue Nymphaliden aus Africa. Deutsche Entomologische Zeitschrift, Iris 17:108-123.
Suffert, E. (1904) Neue Tagfalter aus Deutsch-Ost-Africa. Deutsche Entomologische Zeitschrift, Iris 17:124-132
Die Naturwissenschaften

External links
EOL Encyclopedia of Life Taxa described  by Ernst Suffert

German lepidopterists
Year of birth missing
Year of death missing